Unione Sportiva Venafro is an Italian association football club located in Venafro, Molise.

Venafro does not join 2011-12 Serie D and relegated to Eccellenza Molise.

References

External links
  

Association football clubs established in 1966
Football clubs in Molise
Italian football clubs established in 1966